Brainerd High School is a public high school located in Chattanooga, Tennessee. It is operated by the Hamilton County school district.

Athletics 
Several sports teams are represented at the school. The school's mascot is the Panther. Sports include baseball, basketball, cross country, football, golf, tennis, track and field, and wrestling.

State championships 
Baseball - 1965
Boys' basketball - 1984, 1988, 1992
Girls' basketball - 1984
Boys' cross country - 1999
Boys' track and field - 1966, 1967, 1970, 1977, 1979, 1986, 1996, 1998, 1999, 2000, 2005, 2006, 2007, 2008, 2017
Girls' track and field - 1978, 1985, 1986, 1990, 1995, 1996, 1997, 1998, 1999, 2000, 2001, 2008, 2016.
Wrestling - 1966, 1967, 1968, 1969, 1970, 1971, 1986.

Demographics 
According to U.S. News & World Report, 93% of the student body is African American, 4% is white, 1% is Hispanic, and 0.2% is Native American. 53% of the student body is male, and 47% is female.

Notable alumni 
Tom Griscom, 1971

Leslie Jordan, 1973

Malcolm Mackey, 1988

George S. Clinton, 1965

References 

Educational institutions established in 1960
Schools in Chattanooga, Tennessee
1960 establishments in Tennessee
Public high schools in Tennessee